The 2017 Gardner–Webb Runnin' Bulldogs football team represented Gardner–Webb University in the 2017 NCAA Division I FCS football season. They were led by fifth-year head coach Carroll McCray and played their home games at Ernest W. Spangler Stadium. They played as a member of the Big South Conference. They finished the season 1–10, 0–5 in Big South play to finish in last place.

Schedule

Source:

Game summaries

North Carolina A&T

at Wyoming

Western Carolina

at Wofford

Shorter

at North Carolina Central

at Kennesaw State

Liberty

Charleston Southern

at Monmouth

at Presbyterian

Sources:

References

Gardner-Webb
Gardner–Webb Runnin' Bulldogs football seasons
Gardner-Webb Runnin' Bulldogs f